Royal Irish Academy MS 24 P 33 is an Irish dunaire or 'poem-book' compiled by the scribe Ruaidhrí Ó hÚigínn, sometime in the late seventeenth century. It was made for the Clandeboy O'Neills. Alongside the poems are two prose historical tracts, dating from apparently the late sixteenth century; An Leabhar Eoghanach, and Ceart Uí Néill

References
 Leabhar Cloinne Aodha Buidhe, ed. T. Ó Donnchadha, Dublin, 1931, pp. ix-xii.
 Tyrone's Gaelic Literary Legacy, by Diarmaid Ó Diobhlin, in Tyrone: History and Society, 403–432, ed. Charles Dillon and Henry A. Jefferies, Geography Publications, Dublin, 2000. .

Irish manuscripts
17th-century manuscripts
Royal Irish Academy Library
Irish-language literature